Nora Ross is an American trap shooting champion. She is known for being perhaps the best one-eye shooter in the United States. She’s a 34-time All-American, 15-time All American Ladies Captain, and a 30-time Trap and Field Average winner.  Ross is the first woman to break 200 in doubles. She was inducted into the Trapshooting Hall of Fame in 1999.

References

Trap and double trap shooters
Living people
Year of birth missing (living people)